Princess Maria Petrovna Galitzine (11 May 1988 – 4 May 2020) was a Luxembourg-born Russian interior designer.

Biography 
Princess Maria was born on 11 May 1988 in Luxembourg City, Luxembourg as the fourth of six children of Prince Peter Galitzine and Archduchess Maria Anna of Austria. She is a member of the House of Golitsyn, a Russian noble family with Lithuanian ancestry. Her mother, the daughter of Archduke Rudolf of Austria and Countess Xenia Czernichev-Besobrasov, is a member of the House of Habsburg-Lorraine. Princess Maria was a great-granddaughter of Charles I and Zita of Bourbon-Parma, the last Emperor and Empress of Austria. She was also a descendant of King George II via his daughter Anne, Princess Royal. She was a younger sister of Princess Tatiana Galitzine.

In 1993, she moved to Russia with her parents and attended the German School of Moscow. She attended the College of Art & Design in Brussels before moving to Chicago to work as an interior designer. She later moved to Houston.

She married Rishi Roop Singh, a Houston-based chef of Indian descent, in a Russian Orthodox ceremony on 10 February 2017. They had one son, Maxim Vir Singh.

She died on 4 May 2020 from a cardiac aneurysm. She is buried in the Eastern Orthodox section of Forest Park Westheimer Cemetery in Houston.

References 

1988 births
2020 deaths
Golitsyn family
People from Houston
People from Luxembourg City
Interior designers
Russian people of Austrian descent
Russian princesses
Members of the Russian Orthodox Church